Cold shrinking is a process in motor vehicle bodyworks. Compared with hot shrinking, cold shrinking is a longer process, but it is the most preferred method and most common especially where the stretched area is bigger. Cold shrinking is mostly done by use of a dolly hammer. The rough surface is the fill using a body filler or a body solder in order to give a smooth finish.

This is a method of panel beating where heating is not done to the stretched panel. This method is mostly suitable for integral cars with integral body panels such as hatchbacks.

See also 
Hot shrinking almost similar process
Panel beating

References 

Motor vehicle maintenance
Car ownership
Conservation and restoration of vehicles
Automotive terminology